Crayon Angel: A Tribute To The Music of Judee Sill is a tribute album to Judee Sill released in 2009.

Track listing
Ron Sexsmith - "Crayon Angel"
Beth Orton - "Reach for the Sky"
Daniel Rossen - "Waterfall"
Frida Hyvönen - "Jesus Was a Cross Maker"
Shalants -  "Lopin Along Thru the Cosmos"
Final Fantasy - "The Donor"
Nicolai Dunger -"Soldier of the Heart"
Trembling Blue Stars - "Lady-O"
Colossal Yes - "The Phoenix"
Marissa Nadler & Black Hole Infinity - "The Kiss"
Princeton -"Down Where the Valleys Are Low"
The Bye Bye Blackbirds - "There's a Rugged Road"
Meg Baird - "When the Bridegroom Comes"
Bill Callahan - "For a Rainbow"
P.G. Six - "Til Dreams Come True"

References

Folk albums by American artists
Tribute albums
2009 compilation albums
Folk compilation albums